The dental pad or browsing pad is a feature of ruminant dental anatomy that results from a lack of upper incisors and helps them gather large quantities of grass and other plant matter. This feature can be found in ruminants such as cattle and sheep. In cattle, the tongue is used to grasp food and pinch it off between the dental pad and the lower incisors.

References

Livestock
Veterinary dentistry